Berkley is a surname. Notable people with the surname include:

Austin Berkley (born 1973), former English professional footballer
Elizabeth Berkley (born 1972), American TV and film actress
George Berkley (engineer) (died 1893), British civil engineer
Richard L. Berkley (born 1931), mayor of Kansas City, Missouri (1979–1991)
Robyn Berkley, fashion publicist
Seth Berkley (born 1956), American epidemiologist
Shelley Berkley (born 1951), U.S. Congresswoman
Theresa Berkley (died 1836), 19th century London dominatrix
W.R. Berkley (born 1946), Insurance Tycoon. Founder for W. R. Berkley Corporation